Patricia Maxwell, born Patricia Anne Ponder (born March 9, 1942 near Goldonna, Louisiana) is an American writer. A member of the Romance Writers of America Hall of Fame and the Affaire de Coeur Romance Hall of Fame, Maxwell has received numerous awards for her writing. Her first novel in the romance genre, Love's Wild Desire, became a New York Times Bestseller.

Maxwell has published books under five different names. Using her real name, Patricia Maxwell, she writes Gothic mystery-suspense romances; she wrote one book in collaboration with Carol Albritton that was published under the name Elizabeth Trehearne. Under her maiden name, Patricia Ponder, she wrote a murder mystery and a romantic suspense story, as Maxine Patrick, she has written contemporary romances, and as Jennifer Blake historical romances.  Many of her books are set in her native Louisiana.

Biography

Early years
Maxwell is a seventh generation Louisianan of English, Irish, Welsh, Scots-German, French and Indigenous descent.    She was born in a one-hundred-twenty-year-old house constructed by her grandparents near Goldonna.  She spent her childhood on an  farm in Northern Louisiana.   Through her mother, who belonged to a mail order book club, Maxwell was introduced at an early age to adult mysteries, westerns, historical novels, and romances.  As a young teenager, she volunteered at the school library, further cementing her love of the written word.

At age 15, Patricia Ponder married and took her husband's surname of Maxwell, becoming a housewife and mother.  She began writing one morning when she was 21, attempting to describe a very vivid dream she'd had that was set in historical Scotland. She took a six-week correspondence course on writing and began practicing as much as she could.

Writing career
For the next seven years, Maxwell sold various poems, articles, and short stories before deciding to take the time to write a novel.  Her husband supported her efforts, even buying her a typewriter to make the work easier.  After objectively assessing her first novel, Maxwell decided that it was not good enough to sell, and promptly started on a second manuscript.  This one sold in 1970, to the first publisher who actually read it.  A stunned Maxwell used her first check to buy a greenhouse—something she had long wanted.

Maxwell's early works, published under her own name, were mystery suspense novels.  In the mid-1970s, this type of novel became less popular, and Maxwell suddenly had trouble selling new works.  After two years of struggling to find another niche, Maxwell was asked to write a proposal for an emerging genre, historical romance.  Her first novel in this genre, Love's Wild Desire, became a New York Times Bestseller under the pseudonym Jennifer Blake (so that fans of her previous work would not be confused).

Maxwell has been writing romance and historical novels as Jennifer Blake for over 30 years.  The book are often set between 1830-1850 and take place in Louisiana.

Personal life
Maxwell writes for six hours a day, five days a week in her home office, usually completing one book each year.  In her spare time, she enjoys collecting antiques, painting, and quilting.  Because she is allergic to many chemicals, she and her husband maintain a small organic garden to cultivate their own produce.  They also grow antique roses.

Maxwell and her husband live in Northern Louisiana, with a second home in Colorado.  They have four children and several grandchildren.

Bibliography

As Patricia Maxwell

Single novels
The Secret of the Mirror House, 1970
Stranger at Plantation Inn, 1971
The Bewitching Grace, 1973
The Court of the Thorn Tree, 1973
Dark Masquerade, 1974
Bride of a Stranger, 1974
Love's Wild Desire, 1977
The Notorious Angel, 1977
Sweet Piracy, 1978
Night of the Candles, 1978

As Elizabeth Trehearne

Single Novel
Storm at Midnight, 1973

As Patricia Ponder

Single novels
Haven of Fear, 1974
Murder for Charity, 1974

As Maxine Patrick

Single novels
The Abducted Heart, 1978
Bayou Bride, 1978
Snowbound Heart, 1979
Captive Kisses, 1980
Love at Sea, 1980
April of Enchantment, 1981

As Jennifer Blake

Single novels
Tender Betrayal, 1979
The Storm and the Splendor, 1979
Golden Fancy, 1980
Embrace and Conquer, 1981
Midnight Waltz, 1984
Surrender in Moonlight, 1984
Fierce Eden, 1985
Prisoner of Desire, 1986
Louisiana Dawn, 1987
Southern Rapture, 1987
Perfume of Paradise, 1988
Love and Smoke, 1989
Spanish Serenade, 1990
Joy and Anger, 1991
Wildest Dreams, 1992
Arrow to the Heart, 1993
Shameless, 1994
Silver-Tongued Devil, 1995
Tigress, 1996
Garden of Scandal, 1997

Royal Family of Ruthenia series
Royal Seduction, 1983
Royal Passion, 1985

Louisiana's Gentlemen Benedict series
Kane, 1998
Luke, 1999
Roan, 2000
Clay, 2001
"Adam" in With a Southern Touch, 2002
Wade, 2002

Masters at Arms series
Challenge to Honor, 2005
Dawn Encounter, 2006
Rogue's Salute, 2007
Guarded Heart, 2008
Gallant Match, 2009

Anthologies in collaboration
"Dream Lover" in A Dream Come True, 1994 (with Georgina Gentry, Shirl Henke, Anita Mills and Becky Lee Weyrich)
"Besieged Heart" in Secret of the Heart, 1994 (with Madeline Baker, Georgina Gentry, Shirl Henke and Patricia Rice)
"The Warlock's Daughter" in Star-Dust, 1994
"Reservations" in Honeymoon Suite, 1995 (with Margaret Brownley, Ruth Jean Dale and Sheryl Lynn)
"Out of the Dark" in A Purrfect Romance!, 1995 (with Robin Lee Hatcher and Susan Wiggs)
"Pieces of Dreams" in The Quilting Circle, 1996 (with Jo Anne Cassidy, Joanne Cassity, Christina Cordaire and Linda Shertzer)
A Vision of Sugarplums in Joyous Season, 1996 (with Olga Bicos, Hannah Howell and Fern Michaels)
"Love in Three-Quarter Time" in Unmasked, 1997 (with Janet Dailey and Elizabeth Gage)
"John 'Rip' Peterson" in Southern Gentleman, 1998 (with Emilie Richards)
With a Southern Touch, 2002 (with Heather Graham and Diana Palmer)
"Pieces of Dreams" in With Love, 2002 (with Kristin Hannah and Linda Lael Miller)

Awards

Inducted into Romance Writers of America Hall of Fame
1997 Frank Waters Award for Writing Excellence
1997 Holt Medallion, Southern Theme, Virginia Romance Writers: SILVER-TONGUED DEVIL
1995 "Climbing Rose" Award, North Louisiana Romance Authors
1995 Lifetime Honorary Membership, Coeur de Louisiane, Inc. Writers Club
1994 Romance Hall of Fame, Affaire de Coeur Magazine
1994 Reviewer’s Choice Winner, Affaire de Coeur: SHAMELESS
1993-1994 Reviewer’s Choice Certificate of Excellence, Romantic Times: SHAMELESS
1992-1993 Reviewer’s Choice Certificate of Excellence, Romantic Times: ARROW TO THE HEART
1991-1992 Reviewer’s Choice Certificate of Excellence, Romantic Times: WILDEST DREAMS
1988 Keynote Speaker, Romance Writers of America National Conference
1988 Honorary Membership, Romance Writers of America
1988 Silver Plume Award, Affaire de Coeur: SOUTHERN RAPTURE 1988 Best Colonial Romance, Romantic Times: LOUISIANA DAWN
1987 Golden Treasure Award, Lifetime Achievement, Romance Writers of America
1987 "Maggie" Award, Georgia Romance Writers: SOUTHERN RAPTURE
1987 "Climbing Rose" Award, North Louisiana Romance Authors
1985 "Maggie" Award, Georgia Romance Writers: MIDNIGHT WALTZ
1985 Historical Romance Author of the Year, Romantic Times

See also
List of romantic novelists

References and sources

Patricia Anne Ponder Maxwell's Official Website
Jennifer Blake at eHarlequin
Jennifer Blake at Mills & Boon

External links
Jennifer Blake at Fantastic Fiction

1942 births
American romantic fiction writers
Living people
Novelists from Louisiana
20th-century American novelists
21st-century American novelists
20th-century American women writers
21st-century American women writers
American women novelists
Women romantic fiction writers
People from Goldonna, Louisiana
20th-century pseudonymous writers
21st-century pseudonymous writers
Pseudonymous women writers